Barraiya is a god in Australian Aboriginal mythology who created the first vagina with a spear so that Eingana could give birth.

References

Australian Aboriginal gods